Swan Song is a 2021 American drama film, written, directed, and produced by Todd Stephens. It stars Udo Kier, Jennifer Coolidge, Linda Evans, Michael Urie, Ira Hawkins, and Stephanie McVay.

It had its world premiere at South by Southwest on March 17, 2021. It was released in a limited release on August 6, 2021, prior to video on demand on August 13, 2021, by Magnolia Pictures.

Plot
Retired hairdresser Pat Pitsenbarger, once renowned as the "Liberace of Sandusky", takes a long walk to style his former client's hair for her funeral.

Cast

Release
The film had its world premiere at South by Southwest on March 17, 2021. Prior to, Magnolia Pictures acquired worldwide distribution rights to the film. It was released in a limited release on August 6, 2021, prior to video on demand on August 13, 2021.

Reception
Swan Song received positive reviews from film critics.  On Metacritic, the film holds a rating of 65 out of 100, based on 26 critics, indicating "generally favorable reviews".

Accolades 
On December 14, 2021, Udo Kier was nominated for an Independent Spirit Award for Best Male Lead. On January 21, 2022, the film itself was nominated for a GLAAD Media Award for Outstanding Film – Limited Release.

References

External links
 
 
 

2021 films
2021 LGBT-related films
2021 independent films
American independent films
American LGBT-related films
American drama films
Films about death
Films set in Ohio
2020s English-language films
2020s American films